Troy Brouwer (born August 17, 1985) is a Canadian former professional ice hockey winger. He played for the Chicago Blackhawks, Washington Capitals, Calgary Flames, Florida Panthers and the St. Louis Blues of the National Hockey League (NHL). The Blackhawks selected him in the seventh round, 214th overall in the 2004 NHL Entry Draft.

He was a member of the Stanley Cup-winning Blackhawks in 2010.

Playing career

Early career
Brouwer was educated at North Delta Secondary School. He was drafted 214th overall in the 2004 NHL Entry Draft by the Chicago Blackhawks. Brouwer spent his major junior career in the Western Hockey League (WHL) with the Moose Jaw Warriors. In his final year with the Warriors in 2005–06, he was named team captain and led Moose Jaw with a team-high 49 goals and 53 assists. Brouwer's 102 points also led the league in points, by which he was awarded the Bob Clarke Trophy.

Professional

Chicago Blackhawks
Brouwer was assigned to the Norfolk Admirals, the Blackhawks' American Hockey League (AHL) affiliate in 2006–07, where he recorded 79 points and was named to the AHL All-Rookie and Second All-Star Team. He also made his NHL debut that season, playing 10 games with the Blackhawks. As a Blackhawk, Brouwer joined three of his previous minor hockey teammates, Colin Fraser, Brent Seabrook and Andrew Ladd from his Vancouver team, the Pacific Vipers.

In the 2007–08 season, Brouwer was again in the AHL with the Rockford IceHogs, Chicago's newly assigned AHL affiliate. Although his production dropped to 54 points in 75 games, he scored a franchise-record 25 power play goals, just two shy of the league record. Recalled by the Blackhawks for a short two-game stint, Brouwer recorded his first NHL point, an assist on March 23, 2008, against the St. Louis Blues. 

The 2009–10 season saw a huge improvement in Brouwer's performance, where he scored 22 goals and 40 points that season. In the 2010 Stanley Cup playoffs, Brouwer played in 19 games for the Blackhawks and won the 2010 Stanley Cup Finals.

The following season, Brouwer continued to put up decent numbers for the Blackhawks despite being tenth in scoring on the team.

Washington Capitals
On June 24, 2011, Brouwer was traded to the Washington Capitals for Washington's first round pick in the 2011 NHL Entry Draft. On July 6, Brouwer signed a two-year, $4.7 million contract with the Capitals.

During the 2011–12 season, on January 13, 2012, he recorded his first NHL hat trick against the Tampa Bay Lightning.

On September 12, 2012, the Capitals signed Brouwer to a three-year, $11 million contract extension worth $3,666,667 annually.

St. Louis Blues
On July 2, 2015, the Capitals traded Brouwer to the St. Louis Blues along with Pheonix Copley and a 2016 3rd-round draft pick in exchange for T. J. Oshie. He elevated his play for the Blues in 20 playoff games as the Blues reached the Western Conference Finals. Brouwer scored eight goals during the postseason, including the game-winning goal in Game 7 of Round One against his former team, the Blackhawks.

Calgary Flames
At the conclusion of his contract with the Blues, Brouwer left to sign as a free agent to a four-year, $18 million contract with the Calgary Flames on July 1, 2016. Prior to the beginning of the season, Brouwer was named one of the team's alternate captains. In his first season with the club, Brouwer’s performance declined heavily, and he only managed to record 25 points in 74 games.

During the 2017-18 season, Brouwer’s performance hit an even bigger decline, and recorded a career low 6 goals and 22 points in 76 games. Brouwer did not record a single goal until December 4, 2017 against the Philadelphia Flyers. For only the second time in his NHL career, Brouwer did not qualify for the playoffs. On August 3, 2018, the Flames bought out the final two years of Brouwer's contract, making him an unrestricted free agent.

Florida Panthers
On August 27, 2018, the Florida Panthers signed Brouwer to a one-year, $800,000 contract. In a checking-line role with the Panthers, Brouwer recorded 21 points in 75 games.

On September 4, 2019, as an unsigned free agent over the summer, Brouwer agreed to attend the Panthers' training camp on a professional tryout. After completing his second training camp with the Panthers he was released from his professional tryout during the pre-season on September 25, 2019.

Return to St. Louis
On November 11, 2019, Brouwer (alongside former Panthers' teammate Jamie McGinn) was signed to a professional tryout by the Blues. On November 20, the Blues signed Brouwer to a one-year, two-way contract for the remainder of the season.

Retirement
On November 18, 2021, Brouwer announced his retirement from professional hockey.

Career statistics

Regular season and playoffs

International

Awards and honours

References

External links
 

1985 births
Living people
Calgary Flames players
Canadian ice hockey right wingers
Chicago Blackhawks draft picks
Chicago Blackhawks players
Florida Panthers players
Moose Jaw Warriors players
Norfolk Admirals players
People from Delta, British Columbia
Rockford IceHogs (AHL) players
Ice hockey people from Vancouver
St. Louis Blues players
Stanley Cup champions
Washington Capitals players